The Bremberg is a mountain,  high, in the Rothaar Mountains range in the district of Hochsauerland, in North Rhine-Westphalia, Germany.

The mountain lies just under 3 km west-southwest of the ski resort of Winterberg, about 1 km west-southwest of the Poppenberg (745.5 m) and around 1.3 km (as the crow flies) north-northeast of the Kahler Asten (841.9 m). Part of the Rhine-Weser watershed runs over the Bremberg.

On and around the Bremberg is part of the ski area known as the Skiliftkarussell Winterberg with langlauf trails (Loipen), a langlauf stadium, which often hosts international competitions, ski lifts and their associated  pistes and, on the eastern spur of the mountain, a toboggan run and a small ski jump.

See also 
 List of mountains and hills in North Rhine-Westphalia

External links 
 Skiliftkarussell Winterberg
 Langlauf trails in Winterberg

Mountains and hills of North Rhine-Westphalia
Mountains under 1000 metres
Mountains and hills of the Rothaar